The Railroad Raiders of '62 is an American silent film produced by Kalem Company and directed by Sidney Olcott with Jack J. Clark, Robert Vignola and JP McGowan in the leading roles. The action takes place during the U.S. civil war.

Cast
 Jack J. Clark -
 Robert Vignola - 
 JP McGowan -

Production notes
 The film was shot in Jacksonville, Florida.
 In 1915, JP McGowan made a remake of The Railroad Raiders of '62 in The Hazards of Helen series #19, with Helen Holmes.
 Buster Keaton was inspired by the story of The Railroad Raiders of '62, the raid of James J. Andrews, to shoot The General in 1926.
 This is only one of three films depicting Andrews' Raid. The other two films were The General (1926), and The Great Locomotive Chase (1956).

External links

 The Railroad Raiders of '62 website dedicated to Sidney Olcott

1911 films
Silent American drama films
American silent short films
Films set in Florida
Films shot in Jacksonville, Florida
Films directed by Sidney Olcott
1911 short films
1911 drama films
American black-and-white films
1910s American films